The 2nd Mountain Troops Brigade "Sarmizegetusa" (Brigada 2 Vânători de Munte „Sarmizegetusa”) is a mountain troops brigade of the Romanian Land Forces.

The brigade was initially formed as the 2nd Mountain Troops Division on 1 August 1923, and was named after the most important Dacian military, religious and political centre. The 2nd Mountain Brigade is currently subordinated to the 2nd Infantry Division and has its headquarters in Brașov.  Units from the brigade were often deployed to peacekeeping missions in Afghanistan and Iraq. The structural reorganization process of the brigade was completed in early 2003, with the subordination of the 33rd Mountain Troops Battalion. The 33rd Mountain Troops battalion is currently deployed in Afghanistan as part of the ISAF.

Organization 2020 
 2nd Mountain Hunters Brigade "Sarmizegetusa", in Brașov
 21st Mountain Hunters Battalion "General Leonard Mociulschi", in Predeal
 30th Mountain Hunters Battalion "Dragoslavele", in Câmpulung
 33rd Mountain Hunters Battalion "Posada", in Curtea de Argeș
 206th Artillery Battalion 'General Mihail Lăcătușu", in Ghimbav
 228th Anti-aircraft Defense Battalion "Piatra Craiului", in Brașov
 229th Logistic Support Battalion, in Brașov

External links 
 

Brigades of Romania
Military units and formations established in 1923
1923 establishments in Romania
Mountain infantry brigades